Sir Robert Broughton (died 17 August 1506) was a landowner, soldier, and Member of Parliament for Suffolk. He was knighted at the Battle of Stoke, where he fought on the Lancastrian side under John de Vere, 13th Earl of Oxford. He was a close associate of the Earl, and is said to have married the Earl's illegitimate daughter, Katherine.

Family
Robert Broughton was the son of John Broughton (d.1479) of Denston, and Anne Denston (d.1481), daughter and heir of John Denston (d.1473) by Katherine Clopton, daughter of Sir William Clopton (d.1446) of Long Melford. Portraits of Robert Broughton's parents are preserved in the stained glass windows of Holy Trinity Church, Long Melford, Suffolk, while the 'cadaver tomb' of his maternal grandparents is in the church of St Nicholas at Denston.

The Broughton family, of Broughton in Buckinghamshire, is said to have acquired its wealth through marriage with an heiress in the early fifteenth century. Mary Pever, the daughter of Thomas Pever (d. 22 September 1429) by Margaret Loring, one of the two daughters and coheirs of Sir Nigel Loring (d. 13 March 1386), a founding member of the Order of the Garter, married firstly Sir Richard St. Maur (d. 6 January 1409), and secondly John Broughton, by whom she had a son, John Broughton (d.1489), Sheriff of Bedfordshire, whose son, John Broughton (d.1479), married Anne Denston (d.1481) and predeceased his father by ten years, leaving a son, Robert, to inherit the Broughton estates.

Broughton had two brothers, William and Edward, and a sister, Elizabeth, married to Edmund Cornwall.

The Broughton arms are given as 'Argent, a chevron between three mullets gules'.

Career
Broughton was appointed Knight of the Order of the Bath when the four-year-old Richard, Duke of York, second son to King Edward IV, one of the two princes later said to have been murdered in the Tower of London, married Anne de Mowbray on 15 January 1478.

He was a close associate of John de Vere, 13th Earl of Oxford, and a feudal tenant of the Earl in Ashdon, Essex and Stony Stratford, Buckinghamshire. He fought under the Earl's banner at the Battle of Stoke in June 1487, and was knighted on the battlefield together with John Paston II and George Hopton. According to Richmond, a record of the knighting of Broughton, Paston and Hopton is found in a copy of William Caxton's Game and Playe of the Chesse once owned by John Paston III, and now in the British Library. Broughton's name is also found on a list in the royal household books of those in the 13th Earl's affinity who were to raise forces in July 1487 at the King's and the Earl's costs and charges.

In January 1488 Broughton was a witness to a recognizance in the amount of £2000 taken by the 13th Earl from Sir Edmund Hastings to guarantee Hastings' continuing loyalty to Henry VII.

In 1489 he was elected Member of Parliament for Suffolk, likely as a result of the 13th Earl's influence.

In January 1496 Broughton served as deputy to the 13th Earl as Constable of Clare Castle, Suffolk. 

In October 1501 he was among those who participated in an entertainment on a grand scale to welcome to England Catherine of Aragon, the bride of Henry VII's eldest son and heir, Arthur, Prince of Wales. After journeying on the Thames to the Tower of London, Catherine was met by King Henry VII's second son, the future Henry VIII, accompanied by the Archbishop of York, the Bishop of Durham, the Earls of Suffolk and Shrewsbury, several barons, and a number of knights, including Broughton.

Broughton made his will on 20 June 1504, requesting burial in Denston church, and appointing his wife, Katherine, as one of his executors, and the 13th Earl of Oxford as supervisor. He died on 17 August 1506. His will was proved 10 July 1507. The inquisition post mortem taken after Broughton's death assessed his annual income at £600, making him 'one of the richest non-baronial landowners in England'.

Broughton's two sons received legacies in the 13th Earl's will when the Earl died in 1513. The elder son, John, was bequeathed two silver flagons, while the younger, Robert, was given £40. Robert appears to have been in the 13th Earl's service, as he was also granted an annuity of 53s 4d.

Marriage and issue
Broughton married firstly Katherine de Vere, said to have been the illegitimate daughter of John de Vere, 13th Earl of Oxford, by whom he had two sons and a daughter:

John Broughton (d. 24 January 1518) of Toddington, Bedfordshire, aged fifteen at his father's death. He married Anne Sapcote (d. 14 March 1559), the daughter and heir of Sir Guy Sapcote by Margaret Wolston, daughter and heir of Sir Guy Wolston, and by her had a son and three daughters:
John Broughton (d.1528).
Katherine Broughton (d. 23 April 1535), who was the first wife of William Howard, 1st Baron Howard of Effingham.
Anne Broughton, who married, as his second wife, by dispensation dated 24 May 1539, Sir Thomas Cheyney.
Elizabeth Broughton, who died unmarried in 1524. There is a monument to her at Chenies.

Robert Broughton.
Margaret Broughton (d. 6 August 1524), who married Henry Everard (d.1541), by whom she had several children, including Elizabeth Everard, who married Sir William Clopton (d. 6 October 1568) of Liston Hall, Essex. After the death of Margaret Broughton, Henry Everard married Lore (née Wentworth), widow of Edward Shaw and daughter of Sir Roger Wentworth by Anne Tyrrell, daughter of Humphrey Tyrrell. She survived him, and married, as her third husband, Francis Clopton (d.1558).

Broughton married secondly Dorothy Wentworth, the sister of Sir Richard Wentworth (d. 17 October 1528), and daughter of Sir Henry Wentworth (d. August 1499) by Anne Say, daughter of Sir John Say (d.1478) of Broxbourne. Dorothy Wentworth's sister, Margery Wentworth, married Sir John Seymour, by whom she was the mother of Henry VIII's third wife, Jane Seymour.

Notes

References

External links
Will of John de Vere, Earl of Oxford, proved 10 May 1513, PROB 11/17/379, National Archives Retrieved 1 June 2013
Will of Sir Robert Broughton, proved 10 July 1507, PROB 11/15/535, National Archives Retrieved 1 June 2013
Will of John Broughton, proved 4 June 1519, PROB 11/19/251, National Archives Retrieved 1 June 2013
Will of John Broughton, proved 14 August 1489, PROB 11/8/396, National Archives Retrieved 5 June 2013
Stained glass windows depicting John Broughton and Anne Denston, Long Melford Parish Church Retrieved 6 June 2013]

1506 deaths
Knights of the Bath
People of the Wars of the Roses
English MPs 1489
16th-century English people
Year of birth unknown